Love for Sale may refer to:

Film
 Love for Sale (1951 film), a Mexican musical film
 Love for Sale (2006 film), or Suely in the Sky, a Brazilian drama film
 Love for Sale (2008 film), an American romantic comedy film
 Love for Sale (2018 film), an Indonesian film for which Della Dartyan earned a Citra Award for Best Actress nomination

Literature
 Love for Sale (book), a 2016 book of music history by David Hajdu

Music

Albums
 Love for Sale (Bilal album), 2006
 Love for Sale (Boney M. album), 1977
 Love for Sale (Cecil Taylor album), 1959
 Love for Sale (Dexter Gordon album), a live album recorded in 1964 and released in 1982
 Love for Sale (Great Jazz Trio album), 1976
 Love for Sale (Mary Coughlan album), 1995
 Love for Sale (Tony Bennett and Lady Gaga album), 2021
 Love for Sale, by Eartha Kitt, 1965

Songs
 "Love for Sale" (song), written by Cole Porter, 1930
 "Love for Sale", by Ace of Base, a B-side of "Always Have, Always Will", 1998
 "Love for Sale", by Bon Jovi from New Jersey, 1988
 "Love for Sale", by Motörhead from Snake Bite Love, 1998
 "Love for Sale", by Talking Heads from True Stories, 1986